Candice Night (born May 8, 1971) is an American singer and musician. She has been the vocalist/lyricist and multi-instrumentalist for the traditional folk rock project Blackmore's Night since its origins in 1997 with her husband, guitarist Ritchie Blackmore. She is also the backing vocalist for Rainbow from 1994–1997 and 2015–present, again with Blackmore. Her first solo album, Reflections, was released in 2011.

Career 
Born in Hauppauge, Long Island, New York, as Candice Lauren Isralow, she took piano lessons for a couple of years. She began modeling as "Candice Loren" at 12 years of age. She appeared in everything from commercials to print ads, and promoted products at trade shows until her 20s. Night also had her own radio show on a rock music radio station on Long Island, and attended New York Institute of Technology where she studied communications. She is Jewish.

She was once a Rainbow fan, so she met Ritchie Blackmore to ask him for an autograph in 1989. They talked about ghosts, music, travel, history, and philosophy, gradually became friends, and then lived together from 1991. She provided backing vocals on the instrumental track "Difficult to Cure" in 1993's European tour of Deep Purple. She also provided singing backing vocals on "Ariel", "Black Masquerade", "Wolf to the Moon" and "Hall of the Mountain King" for Stranger in Us All, the CD by Rainbow, as well as writing lyrics for the four songs on the aforementioned album. Despite her being inexperienced as a professional lead singer, Blackmore encouraged her to become his musical partner. She then wrote lyrics for most of the songs on the first Blackmore's Night album, Shadow of the Moon where she supplied lead vocals. Those songs were written with her voice in his mind.

Night has also composed some full songs, including "Now and Then" on Under a Violet Moon (1999) and "3 Black Crows" and "Ivory Tower" on Ghost of a Rose (2003). She continues to write all the lyrics for the Blackmore's Night songs and plays nine renaissance and medieval instruments.

Since then, she has been awarded gold albums and other awards for the music of Blackmore's Night, and has charted internationally with the group's music. She continues to be involved in music, performing both on CDs and in concert, writing lyrics, singing, and playing medieval instruments: shawm, cornamuse, rauschpfeife, pennywhistle, and chanters.

In 2006 Night sang on Helloween's "Light the Universe" song from their Keeper of the Seven Keys: The Legacy album, and she also appeared In Helloween's music video for that track.

She played the part of Oria in the rock opera Story of Aina, with Sass Jordan and Glenn Hughes. She sang three songs on Beto Vázquez Infinity's eponymous album with Tarja Turunen from Nightwish and Sabine Edelsbacher from Edenbridge. The Blackmore's Night song "Old Mill Inn" was heard in Jim Carrey's 2008 film Yes Man.

She also appears on interactive video screens throughout the US and Japan in the theme park MagiQuest as both Princess Amora and Princess Candice. These parks now have a cooperation throughout the US. She was also the Faerie Queen for Faerie Magazine for two years, appearing on the cover in spring 2007, and making appearances and performing at the Faerie Festivals throughout the US.

Night is also very well known for her charitable contributions towards animal welfare. Throughout the eleven years of the existence of Blackmore's Night, the duo has donated enough funds for the World Wide Fund for Nature to plant 6,000 fruit trees in Borneo for the orangutan habitat; they have donated to the Save the Bats in Berlin; Save the Badgers in England; local animal charities throughout the US including an annual charity show in which proceeds go to Save A Pet, Little Shelter, Best Friends and North Shore Animal League. They have also donated portions of proceeds of CD sales to the Red Cross to aid the flood victims in Eastern Europe; donated to CO2OL to plant trees in Panama to undo the pollution which their concerts may generate; and donated to UNICEF. Other charities with whom they have cooperated include People for the Ethical Treatment of Animals and the Society for the Prevention of Cruelty to Animals.

After being engaged for nearly fifteen years, Night and Blackmore married in October 2008.

Their daughter, Autumn, was born on May 27, 2010, and was the inspiration for Blackmore's Night's album, Autumn Sky, which was released in September 2010.
On February 7, 2012, Night gave birth to their second child, a son named Rory Dartanyan.

She made her first solo album Reflections, which was released in October 2011. All songs were written by Night and consist of mostly soft rock ballads. Her latest solo release is "Starlight, Starbright". Inspired by the birth of her children, this collection of songs are covers of classic favorites as well as new composition meant to bring the listener to the land of dreams.

In September 2018, Avantasia's mastermind Tobias Sammet announced that she joined the cast for the eighth studio album of the supergroup. She provided co-lead vocals (together with Sammet himself) for the track "Moonglow", from the album of the same name (2019).

Discography

With Rainbow 
 Stranger in Us All (1995)
 Black Masquerade (2013)
 Memories in Rock: Live in Germany (2016)
 Live in Birmingham 2016 (2017)
 Memories in Rock II (2018)

With Blackmore's Night 

 Shadow of the Moon (1997)
 Under a Violet Moon (1999)
 Fires at Midnight (2001)
 Ghost of a Rose (2003)
 The Village Lanterne (2006)
 Winter Carols (2006) – Christmas-themed holiday album
 Secret Voyage (2008)
 Autumn Sky (2010)
 Dancer and the Moon (2013)
 All Our Yesterdays (2015)
Nature's Light (2021)

Solo 
 Alone with Fate (2002) – Limited single
 Reflections (2011)
 Starlight Starbright (2015)

Guest appearances 
 Beto Vázquez Infinity – Beto Vázquez Infinity (2001), "Through Times Part II", "Golden Hair", "Through Times Part III" & "Promises Under the Rain"
 Aina – Days of Rising Doom (2003), "The Siege of Aina" & "Rape of Oria"
 Helloween – Keeper of the Seven Keys: The Legacy (2005), "Light the Universe"
 Various Artists – A Life in Yes: The Chris Squire Tribute (2018), "Don't Kill The Whale"
 Avantasia – Moonglow (2019), "Moonglow"
 William Shatner – The Blues (2020), "The Thrill Is Gone"
 The Prog Collective – Songs We Were Taught (2022), "It's Too Late"
 "We're Gonna Be Drinking" (2022) - d'Artagnan

References

External links 

Candice Night official website
Blackmore's Night official website

1971 births
Living people
American folk singers
American rock singers
American folk rock musicians
American rock musicians
Women rock singers
New-age musicians
Hurdy-gurdy players
Jaw harp players
Tambourine players
Jewish American musicians
Blackmore's Night members
People from Hauppauge, New York
New York Institute of Technology alumni
Jewish rock musicians
Jewish folk singers
Jewish women musicians
21st-century American women singers
21st-century American singers
21st-century drummers
21st-century American Jews